John Clarke may refer to:

Arts
John Clarke Whitfield (1770–1836), English organist and composer
John Sleeper Clarke (1833–1899), American/British actor and manager
John Louis Clarke (1881–1970), Blackfoot wood carver from Montana
John S. Clarke (1885–1959), British lion tamer, politician, poet, newspaper editor and art expert
Bryan Forbes or John Theobald Clarke (1926–2013), English film director, screenwriter, film producer, actor and novelist
John Clarke (actor) (1931–2019), American soap opera actor from Days of Our Lives
John Clarke (poet) (1933–1992), American poet
John Clarke (satirist) (1948–2017), New Zealand/Australian satirist and actor
John Cooper Clarke (born 1949), British performance poet, active since the late 1970s
John Clarke (museum curator) (1954–2020), British museum curator, expert in Ladakhi and Tibetan metalwork
John Clarke (physician, 1582–1653), English physician
John Clarke (physician, 1761–1815), English physician and obstetrician

Business
John Clarke, whaler and one of the discoverers of Jan Mayen
John Clarke (businessman) (1773–1846), American businessman from Saratoga Springs, New York
John Clarke (fur trader) (1781–1852), Hudson's Bay Company fur trader

Government and politics

Canada
John Clarke (Upper Canada) (born 1780s- died 1862), merchant and politician in Upper Canada
John Fitzgerald Clarke (1827–1887), Ontario, Canada MPP
John M. Clarke (1854–1936), lumber merchant, contractor and political figure on Prince Edward Island
John Clarke (activist), Canadian political activist and founder of the Ontario Coalition Against Poverty

New Zealand
John Clarke (public servant), New Zealand public servant

United Kingdom
John Clarke (fl. 1601), MP for Haslemere
John Clarke (died 1675), English landowner and politician
Richard Cromwell or John Clarke (1626–1712), second Lord Protector of England, Scotland and Ireland
John Clarke (Roundhead) (fl. 1648–1681), English politician who sat in the House of Commons between 1653 and 1660, and fought for Parliament in the English Civil War and the Cromwellian conquest of Ireland
John Creemer Clarke (1821–1895), British Member of Parliament

United States
John Hopkins Clarke (1789–1870), U.S. Senator from Rhode Island, 1847–1852
John Clarke (Michigan politician) (1797–1876), American businessman, farmer, and politician
John Jones Clarke (1803–1887), American politician in the Massachusetts legislature
John C. Clarke (1831–1906), American politician in the Wisconsin legislature
John Blades Clarke (1833–1911), U.S. representative from Kentucky, 1875–1876
John Proctor Clarke (1856–1932), judge in New York State
John Hessin Clarke (1857–1945), associate justice of the US Supreme Court
John D. Clarke (1873–1933), U.S. representative from New York, 1921–1924 and 1927–1934
John Clark (Georgia governor) (sometimes spelled Clarke; 1766–1832), Governor of Georgia from 1819 to 1823

Military
Sir John Clarke (British army officer) (1787–1854), officer in the British and Spanish armies
John Thomas Clarke (1868–1947), head of the Canadian military medical service
John Clarke (general), American general in the Creek War from Georgia

Religion
John Clarke (Baptist minister) (1609–1676), co-founder of Rhode Island
John Clarke (dean of Salisbury) (1682–1757), dean of Salisbury Cathedral, mathematician and natural philosopher
John Clarke (Congregationalist minister) (1755–1798), minister, First Church, Boston, Massachusetts
John Clarke (Baptist missionary) (1802–1879), author of Specimens of Dialects 
J. Richard Clarke (born 1927), leader in The Church of Jesus Christ of Latter-day Saints
John Clarke (bishop) (born 1938), retired bishop of the Anglican Church of Canada
John Clarke (dean of Wells) (born 1952), Dean of Wells 2004–15

Science, medicine and academia
John Clarke (provost) (died 1781), provost of Oriel College, Oxford
John Henry Clarke (1853–1931), English classical homeopath
John Mason Clarke (1857–1925), American paleontologist from New York
John L. Clarke (1905–1991), served as president of Ricks College
John Henrik Clarke (1915–1998), self-taught scholar who became an authority on African history and an advocate for Black Studies
John Frederick Clarke (1927–2013), English aeronautical engineer
John Clarke (physicist) (born 1942), English physicist at University of California at Berkeley
John Clarke (mountaineer) (1945–2003), Canadian mountaineer, explorer and wilderness educator
John R. Clarke (scientist) (born 1945), serves as Scientific Director at the United States Navy Experimental Diving Unit
John R. Clarke (historian), Professor in Fine Arts at the University of Texas at Austin
John T. Clarke, (born 1952), American astronomer

Sports
John Erskine Clarke (1827–1920), British rower and clergyman who founded the first parish magazine
John Clarke (Australian cricketer) (1829–1872)
John Clarke (Scottish footballer) (fl. 1890s), footballer who played for Bury, Blackpool and Luton Town
John Clarke (English footballer) (fl. 1910s–1920s), English football forward
John Clarke (rugby league) (fl. 1930s–1940s), Australian rugby league player
John Clarke (cricketer, born 1948), English cricketer
John Clarke (rugby union) (born 1975), New Zealand-born Samoan rugby union player
John Clarke (Gaelic footballer) (fl. 2000s), Gaelic footballer for Down
John Clarke (sailor) (1934–2022), Canadian Olympic sailor
John Clarke (hurler), Irish hurler
John Clarke (footballer, born 2004), English footballer

Other
John Clarke (bushranger) (c. 1846–1867), Australian bushranger
John N. Clarke, United Nations official

See also

John Clark (disambiguation)
Jack Clarke (disambiguation)
Jon Clarke (disambiguation)
John Clerk (disambiguation)
John Clerke (disambiguation)